The 2000 CAF Champions League was the 36th awarding of Africa's premier club football tournament prize organized by the Confederation of African Football (CAF), and the 4th prize under the CAF Champions League format. Hearts of Oak SC of Ghana defeated ES Tunis of Tunisia in the final to win their first title.

Qualifying rounds

Preliminary round

|}
1 AS de Vacoas-Phoenix were ejected from the competition for fielding an ineligible player.

First round

|}
1 APR FC withdrew after the first leg; they were banned from CAF competitions for three years and fined $4000. 
2 Black Africa SC withdrew.

Second round

|}

Group stage

Group A

Group B

Knockout stage

Final

1

Top goalscorers

The top scorers from the 2000 CAF Champions League are as follows:

External links
Champions' Cup 2000 - rsssf.com

 
CAF Champions League seasons
1